The Moseley Wrought Iron Arch Bridge, also known as the Upper Pacific Mills Bridge, is a historic, riveted, wrought iron bowstring arch bridge now located on the campus of Merrimack College in North Andover, Massachusetts. It was added to the National Historic Civil Engineering Landmark list in 1998 and was originally part of the North Canal Historic District on the National Register of Historic Place. It is the oldest iron bridge in Massachusetts, and one of the oldest iron bridges in the United States. It was the first bridge in the United States to use riveted wrought iron plates for the triangular-shaped top chord.

The bridge was completed in 1864 as Moseley Truss Bridge built by the Moseley Iron Building Works of Boston, to connect the Pacific Mills with Canal Street in Lawrence, Massachusetts, by spanning the North Canal. It partially collapsed in the late 1980s, but in 1989 it was removed to the Merrimack College campus in North Andover and was rehabilitated under the direction of Francis E. Griggs, Jr., Professor of Civil Engineering. It was placed over a campus pond as a footbridge, and was rededicated in this new location on October 23, 1995.

See also
Hares Hill Road Bridge
List of bridges documented by the Historic American Engineering Record in Massachusetts
Zenas King

References

External links

 

Wrought iron bridges in the United States
Bridges completed in 1864
Former road bridges in the United States
Pedestrian bridges in Massachusetts
Relocated buildings and structures in Massachusetts
Rebuilt buildings and structures in the United States
Tied arch bridges in the United States
Historic American Engineering Record in Massachusetts
Historic Civil Engineering Landmarks
Buildings and structures in North Andover, Massachusetts
Bridges in Essex County, Massachusetts
Road bridges in Massachusetts
Merrimack College